The Chinese Football Association China League, also known as China League One or Chinese Jia League (中甲联赛), is the second level of professional football in China. Above League One is the Chinese Super League.

Prior to the formation of the Chinese Super League, Jia League was known as Jia B League. The then top two levels of Chinese football league were known as Jia A League and Jia B League respectively. Jia A was rebranded as CSL and Jia B was rebranded as the current Jia League in 2004. Below the Jia League is the Yi League, following the Chinese Heavenly Stems naming convention of numbers.

It is currently made up of 18 teams, playing each other home and away once. At the end of each season, the top two teams are promoted to the CSL and the two lowest placed teams from the CSL are relegated to China League Two. The top two teams from China League Two are promoted and replace the two lowest placed teams from China League One.

Current clubs

Clubs Locations

Former clubs

Winners

Attendance

Awards

Top scorers 

 Winner of 2017 China League One Golden Boot.

Most valuable player

Best goalkeeper

Youth player of the year

Best coach

Reserve league and Elite league

Sponsors

See also
 Football in China

References

External links
 Official site 
 News, fixtures, results at Sina.com 
 League history at RSSSF

 
2
Second level football leagues in Asia
Sports leagues established in 2004
2004 establishments in China
Professional sports leagues in China